Enrique Troncoso Troncoso (11 November 1937 – 29 March 2018) was a Roman Catholic bishop.

Enrique Troncoso Troncoso was born in Chile and was ordained to the priesthood in 1961. He served as bishop of the Roman Catholic Diocese of Iquique, Chile, from 1989 to 2000, then as bishop of the Roman Catholic Diocese of Melipilla, Chile, from 2000 to 2014.

Notes

1937 births
2018 deaths
20th-century Roman Catholic bishops in Chile
21st-century Roman Catholic bishops in Chile
Roman Catholic bishops of Iquique
Roman Catholic bishops of Melipilla